Bae Geu-rin (born January 1, 1989) is a South Korean actress.

Filmography

Film

Television series

Music video

References

External links
 
 
 

1989 births
Living people
South Korean television actresses
South Korean film actresses
People from Daegu